Sachin Warrier is an Indian playback singer and composer in the Malayalam film industry from Kerala. He became notable with the song "Muthuchippi Poloru" from the film Thattathin Marayathu. He made his debut with the movie Malarvaadi Arts Club. He was working as a software engineer in Tata Consultancy Services in Kochi. Later he resigned from the job to concentrate more on music. His latest work is as a composer for the movie Aanandam.

Early life 
Sachin was born in Calicut, and grew up in Kottakkal, in Malappuram district. He finished his engineering at FISAT, Angamaly, Kerala.

Career 
He made his debut in playback singing while he was in college, in the year 2010, for the movie Malarvaadi Arts Club. He then joined Tata Consultancy Services and worked for three years, during which period he sang for movies including Thattathin Marayathu, Neram, Left Right Left, Thira, Rasputin, Philips and the Monkey Pen and Bangalore Days. In late 2014, he left his IT job to focus more on music. He also started composing for ads and making music independently around this period. His debut single as an independent musician, called 'Naam' (meaning 'us', in Malayalam) was released in 2015, and premiered in Pepsi MTV Indies channel.

His first movie as a composer was Aanandam, released in 2016.

Discography

As playback singer

As composer

References

External links
Official Website
 

Living people
Musicians from Kozhikode
Malayalam playback singers
Malayali people
Indian male playback singers
Singers from Kerala
Film musicians from Kerala
1989 births
21st-century Indian singers
21st-century Indian male singers